Eduard Sergeyevich Krug (born 21 May 1991) is a former Russian professional football player.

Club career
He made his Russian Football National League debut for FC Sibir Novosibirsk on 3 May 2009 in a game against FC Nizhny Novgorod.

Personal life
He is the younger brother of Yevgeny Krug.

External links
 
 

1991 births
Living people
Russian footballers
Jewish footballers
Association football midfielders
FC Sibir Novosibirsk players
FC Dynamo Barnaul players
FC Novokuznetsk players
FC Irtysh Omsk players
Maccabiah Games footballers
Maccabiah Games competitors for Russia